Pyramid Head, also known as , "Red Pyramid",  is a character from the Silent Hill series, a survival horror video game series created by Japanese company Konami.

Introduced in the 2001 installment Silent Hill 2, he is a type of monster that serves as the main antagonist, stalking James Sunderland, the primary player character, who comes to the town of Silent Hill after receiving a letter from his deceased wife, Mary. The Silent Hill series, particularly the second installment, frequently utilizes psychology and symbolism: Pyramid Head represents James' wish to be punished for Mary's death. Masahiro Ito, the designer of Silent Hill 2s monsters, created the character because he wanted "a monster with a hidden face". Known for his large triangular helmet that conceals his head, Pyramid Head lacks a voice, a visible face, and his appearance stems from the town's past as a place of execution.

He has since appeared in the 2006 film Silent Hill as "Red Pyramid", in the 2007 first-person shooter Silent Hill: The Arcade as a boss, and in the fifth installment of the series, Silent Hill: Homecoming, as the "Bogeyman". He has also made an appearance outside of the Silent Hill series as a selectable character in the 2008 Nintendo DS title New International Track & Field, Super Bomberman R, and was added to Dead by Daylight as a playable Killer in 2020. Positively received in Silent Hill 2 for his role as an element of James' psyche, he has been cited by reviewers as an iconic villain of the series and part of Silent Hill 2s appeal.

Concept and design

Ito wanted to create "a monster with a hidden face", but became unhappy with his designs, which resembled humans wearing masks. He then drew a monster with a pyramid-shaped helmet. According to Ito, the triangle's sharp right and acute angles suggest the possibility of pain. Of the creatures that appear in Silent Hill 2, only Pyramid Head features an "overtly masculine" appearance. He resembles a pale, muscular man covered with a white, blood-soaked robe reminiscent of a butcher's smock. He does not speak, but grunts and moans painfully. His most outstanding feature is his large red, triangular helmet. His weapons consist of the deadly and heavy Great Knife, which the player can find and use for the rest of the game, and later a spear. As a German World War II tank enthusiast, Ito was inspired by the lower hull of the King Tiger heavy tank when designing the edges of the character's helmet; other military vehicles from that region and era informed design elements as well.

According to Konami's Lost Memories, his appearance was a variation of the outfits of the executioners from the fictional history of the town. They wore red hoods and ceremonial robes to make themselves similar to Valtiel, a monster who appears in Silent Hill 3. Like Valtiel, Pyramid Head dresses in gloves and stitched cloth and pursues the game's main protagonist. According to Silent Hill 2s character designer Takayoshi Sato, he appears as a "distorted memory of the executioners" and of the town's past as a place of execution.

Christophe Gans, the director of the film adaptation of Silent Hill, suggested that Pyramid Head "was one of the executioners in the original history of the town" and "there is not one particular or exclusive manifestation of him as an entity." In October 2022, it was revealed that Pyramid Head was inspired by the background characters from the 1995 film, Braveheart.

Appearances

In video games
In Silent Hill 2, after receiving a letter from his deceased wife, Mary, and arriving in the foggy town of Silent Hill to search for her, the game's protagonist and primary player character, James Sunderland, encounters Pyramid Head several times over the course of the game. Pyramid Head, under the new moniker "Bogeyman", makes a significant appearance in 2008 installment Silent Hill: Homecoming, but his role is limited to non-interactive scenes, appearing only twice to the game's main protagonist Alex Shepherd (once in the Grand Hotel in Silent Hill and, much later, in a church, where he executes Alex's father by splitting him in half). His last appearance is in a possible ending to the game: Alex wakes up in a wheelchair as two Pyramid Heads appear, each with part of a helmet, which they use to turn Alex into one of them. After this ending is played, the player obtains the Bogeyman's costume for Alex to wear. Mindful of Pyramid Head's role in Silent Hill 2, the developers chose to include him as "the embodiment of a myth [that] parents started to keep the children out of trouble" and "the accretion of the activities going on in the town of Shepherd’s Glen."

Pyramid Head appears as a boss in the 2007 first-person shooter Silent Hill: The Arcade, as well as Silent Hill: The Escape, but with a composite design with the Butcher, and as a super-deformed selectable character in the 2008 Nintendo DS title New International Track & Field, an installment of the Track & Field series, another spin-off Krazy Kart Racing alongside Robbie the Rabbit, and in 2017's Super Bomberman R as Pyramid Bomber, alongside Simon Belmont from the Castlevania series, and Gradius's Vic Viper. The 2007 game Silent Hill: Origins also included a similar monster named "The Butcher", whom the protagonist occasionally encounters killing other monsters (unlike other versions of Pyramid Head, the Butcher can and must be fought and killed in combat) and a painting of Pyramid Head is seen in the burning house of Alessa. In the 2012 installment Silent Hill: Downpour, Pyramid Head makes a cameo appearance in the "Surprise!" ending, along with various other characters from the franchise. Pyramid Head's most recent appearance was in 2012's Silent Hill: Book of Memories, where he is a monster that can spawn randomly to fight the player. Pyramid Head also appeared as a costume for the Playstation Home.

Pyramid Head was included as a purchasable killer for the survival horror game Dead by Daylight. His title is "The Executioner", a nod to his past as the executioner of Silent Hill. Pyramid Head was a boss character in the Silent Hill DLC of Dark Deception: Monsters & Mortals, In where he's referred to by his original name of Red Pyramid Thing. Pyramid Head also makes a cameo appearance in the PlayStation 5 game Astro's Playroom.

In other media

Pyramid Head makes an appearance in the 2006 film adaptation of Silent Hill as "Red Pyramid", and is portrayed by Roberto Campanella. In the film, the psyches of the female characters shaped the character's physical appearance. Gans claimed that replicating the character's head exactly and having the actor move while wearing it proved to be impractical; he noted that, despite the name, Pyramid Head actually wore "a basin" instead of a triangle-shaped helmet. Red Pyramid's sword and helmet were constructed out of lightweight material painted to appear heavy. For the role, Campanella wore a "five-part prosthetic"; it took two-and-a-half to three hours to get him into costume and make-up. Patrick Tatopoulos, who worked on the make-up effects and monsters, enjoyed the project of designing the character. According to him, Red Pyramid serves as a symbol of the town's darkness and harbinger of its changed character. Gans considered the monsters of the film "a mockery of human beings", and commented: "The real monsters are the people, the cultists who tortured Alessa. When I approached the film, I knew that it was impossible to represent the monsters as simply beasts that jump on you."

In the 2012 film Silent Hill: Revelation, the Pyramid Head, once more portrayed by Roberto Campanella, is both a monster and a guardian. More than once, it saves Sharon from the forces of Silent Hill. This is explained by its loyalty to Alessa: since Heather is the good half of Alessa's soul, it sees them as the same being and is thus bound to protect both from harm. Pyramid Head is also seen controlling the carousel where Heather and Alessa face off against each other, then it kills the cult leader Claudia Wolf after the amulet shows her inner, monstrous nature.

He also makes a cameo appearance in the 2008 Silent Hill comic book Sinner's Reward, published by IDW Publishing. The writer, Tom Waltz, later said he regretted the cameo, which only functioned as fan service. To him, Pyramid Head is a psychological construct created for James; however, he stated that: "At the same time, I don't think that ruined the comic. Some people really liked it. To some people, Pyramid Head should be in all the stories because they do like him." Additionally, the character was portrayed from October 2 to 31, 2009, in the haunted attraction Sinister Pointe, based on Silent Hill, in Orange County, California, United States.

Analysis

The Silent Hill series uses symbolism and psychology; the town of Silent Hill draws upon the psyche of its visitors, ultimately creating an "otherworld," a twisting of reality that manifests delusions and elements of their subconscious minds, varying from character to character. Specifically, in the case of Silent Hill 2's primary player character James Sunderland, the version of the town he explores is influenced by him. Many of the monsters that roam the town symbolize his guilt, wish for punishment, for his wife's three-year-long illness, and cease to exist after James comes to terms with the fact that he killed his wife Mary, partially to end her suffering and partially out of resentment and frustration. James knew she had a terminal illness, which has been speculated to be cancer, and he often read medical textbooks, searching for something to help her. During her last days alive, she became physically repulsive as a result of the illness and treated James abusively, ordering him to leave one moment and begging him to comfort her the next. The knowledge of her terminal illness caused her to become angry and to hurt her loved ones, particularly James, and it pained him to visit her in the hospital. Pyramid Head functions as an executioner of Maria, a delusion of James' who strongly resembles Mary. Through Maria's repeated deaths, Pyramid Head reminds James of Mary's death and causes him to experience guilt and suffering. His appearance as an executioner stems from a picture that James saw while visiting the town three years ago with Mary.

Reviewers have suggested various interpretations. According to Christina González of The Escapist, Pyramid Head acts as "judgement personified, a dark butcher," and "James' masochistic delusion" which punishes him for Mary's death. Ken Gagne of Computerworld suggested that the monster "represents James' anger and guilt." A critic for IGN, Jesse Schedeen, considered Pyramid Head's role throughout the Silent Hill series to be "a manifestation of a person's guilt", commenting: "Pyramid Head is just there to help you serve your penance in the most painful and grotesque way possible."

Reception
Critical reaction to Pyramid Head has been favorable because of his distinctive appearance and role as an element of James' psyche. Critics cite him as an iconic villain of the Silent Hill series, a favorite among fans, and part of the appeal of Silent Hill 2. GameSpot compared Pyramid Head's appearance to Leatherface, the main antagonist of The Texas Chainsaw Massacre series of slasher films, and found him the most terrifying monster in Silent Hill 2. Computerworld named Pyramid Head as one of the most terrifying villains in computer and video games. GamesRadar interpreted the scene in which he kills the two other monsters as rape and called it unsettling, since the subject of rape is not often tackled in video games, and disliked the final battle with him because of how anticlimactic it was, in comparison with his role throughout the rest of the game. Red Bull stated Pyramid Head is "the stuff of nightmares in video games, quite literally. Pyramid Head has terrorized game audiences and fans of the Silent Hill franchise for years." In 2011, Empire ranked him as the 41st-greatest video game character. In 2021, Rachel Weber of GamesRadar ranked Pyramid Head as 31st of their "50 iconic video game characters."

GameDaily ranked Pyramid Head first on their 2008 list of the scariest video game monsters. GamesRadar listed him as one of the 25 best new characters of the decade and ranked him second on its 2009 list of the scariest video game villains, calling him the "most horrifying character ever to have a cult following". In a 2009 retrospective on the survival horror genre, IGN noted that Silent Hill 2 incorporated "a 'stalker' element similar to Clock Tower and Resident Evil 3," and wrote: "To this day, Pyramid Head is remembered as one of gaming's most frightening villains." IGN also described Pyramid Head as one of their favorite video game monsters of all time, stating that "Pyramid Head is no stranger to IGN Stars lately, having shown up in several recent character countdowns. There's just something about Halloween that makes us go all gushy for this horrific monster." PlayStation Universe ranked him as the first on their 2009 list of the scariest monster "to infest a Sony platform", also noting his "prolific reputation as one of video game’s most fearsome monsters." In 2010, Pyramid Head was named as the scariest character in video game history by Joystick Division, who added that "being chased by him in Silent Hill 2 ranks with all of the scariest moments in video gaming history." UGO.com ranked him as number one on their 2011 list of the scariest characters in video games, commenting he is "too mainstream to be all that scary, except he's still really super scary." In 2012, PlayStation Official Magazine included him on their lists of the biggest freaks and scariest characters in the PlayStation games, commenting: "Ol’ Metal Top is easily the best thing about Silent Hill – and maybe even survival horror in general – completely encapsulating that intoxicating dread of knowing that it’s not if you’ll fight him, but when." That same year, FHM included him on their list of ten scariest game characters ever; on the list of the "coolest" video game villains by Complex, Pyramid Head placed as 15th. GamesRadar too praised Pyramid Head's role as an antagonist, putting him in their 2013 list of the best villains in video game history at number 18. GamesRadar staff described Pyramid Head as the best villain in video games, stating that "Silent Hill 2 is ultimately an introspective journey about fighting personal demons, but you have a much more real threat in Pyramid Head."

His appearances outside Silent Hill 2 have received mixed critical reaction. Critics generally agreed that Pyramid Head's appearance in Homecoming struck them as fan service, though Chris Hudak of GameRevolution called it "damned effectively-employed." Masahiro Ito commented that Pyramid Head was designed specifically for James' story in Silent Hill 2, and that, if he were to make another Silent Hill game, he would either not use Pyramid Head again or kill him off entirely in the opening scene. Film critics commented on his role in the film adaption, with several finding him disturbing. DVD Reviews praised Campanella's portrayal of Pyramid Head and another monster, writing: "These are without a doubt some of the most striking bogeymen that I have seen on screen in a long time." His appearance in New International Track & Field received mixed critical reaction. GameDaily disliked it, finding it awkward that a character like Pyramid Head was competing in sporting events with characters like Frogger and Sparkster, while The Escapist called it enjoyable and "hilarious".

See also
 Scissorman, the identity of similar characters in the Clock Tower survival horror video game series
 Nemesis, a similar character in the Resident Evil survival horror video game series

Notes

References

Further reading

External links

 Silent Hill 2 official website 

Male horror film characters
Konami antagonists
Male characters in video games
Silent Hill characters
Video game bosses
Video game characters introduced in 2001
Video game mascots
Fictional mass murderers
Male horror film villains
Fictional monsters